Rosalpatti is a panchayat town in Virudhunagar district in the Indian state of Tamil Nadu.

Demographics
 India census, Rosalpatti had a population of 19,155. Males constitute 51% of the population and females 49%. Rosalpatti has an average literacy rate of 72%, higher than the national average of 59.5%: male literacy is 79%, and female literacy is 64%. In Rosalpatti, 12% of the population is under 6 years of age.

References

Cities and towns in Virudhunagar district